Westmoreland Conservancy, is a nationally accredited all-volunteer land trust located in Murrysville, Pennsylvania in the United States. It was established in 1991 in order to preserve rural and rustic open spaces for the use, enjoyment and benefit of everyone. They have been instrumental in protecting 500 acres of open space since 1991, the first property being the 56-acre Kellman property, now a municipal nature reserve.  This non-profit organization presently owns eight reserves spanning . Seven of these reserves: Caywood (43 acres), King (96), McGinnis (52), Potter (3), Tomer (18), Walter (29), Morosini (183) are crossed by miles of hiking trails and are home to a variety of wildlife, including: deer, skunks, foxes and coyotes. They are available for year-round individual hiking. The  Flinn Reserve currently has no hiking trails and is used for nature study. The 183-acre Morosini Reserve is the most recent property to come under our protection.

Activities 
Throughout the year, the Westmoreland Conservancy sponsors free nature hikes through the reserves. These hikes will often have a special focus of interest such as wildflowers, birds, butterflies, nature photography, or local history. Caching with the Conservancy (CWTC) is a popular geocaching event held annually in June and occasionally in the Fall as well.

Projects 
The Westmoreland Conservancy has partnered with the Municipality of Murrysville to establish an east-west community trail. That trail, known as the Don Harrison Community Trail, makes use of both Conservancy and Municipal properties and utilizes two private Right-of-Way links to create a passage more than 5 miles long. Beginning at the Walter Reserve on Weistertown Road at the western edge of Murrysville, the trail passes through the Murrysville Community Park, the Caywood Reserve, two ROW passages and the King and Potter Reserves the trail crosses both Hills Church and Crowfoot Roads. Once the Sloan School segment of trail is completed it will then cross Sardis Road and pass along a municipal connector to reach Townsend Park at the eastern side of the community.

External links 
 Westmoreland Conservancy official website
 Western Pennsylvania Conservancy official website

Land trusts in Pennsylvania
Protected areas of Westmoreland County, Pennsylvania